The Caracal is a right tributary of the river Olt in Romania. It flows into the Olt in Stoenești.

References

Rivers of Romania
Rivers of Dolj County
Rivers of Olt County
Caracal, Romania